Turini (Aymara turi tower, -ni a suffix to indicate ownership, "the one with a tower", also spelled Torrini) is a  mountain in the Cordillera Real in the Andes of Bolivia. It is located in the La Paz Department, Larecaja Province, Guanay Municipality. Turini lies northwest of the river Uma Pallqa ("water bifurcation", Uma Palca) and the village of Uma Pallqa. It is situated northeast of Jisk'a Turini ("little Turini").

See also 
 Ñuñuni Qalani

References 

Mountains of La Paz Department (Bolivia)